Dizak (also Romanized as Dīzak; also known as Dizaik) is a village in Rudbar Rural District, in the Central District of Tafresh County, Markazi Province, Iran. At the 2006 census, its population was 65, in 22 families.

References 

Populated places in Tafresh County